Gaetano Brunetti or Cayetano Brunetti (1744 in Fano – 16 December 1798 near Madrid) was a prolific Italian born composer active in Spain under kings Charles III and IV.  Though he was musically influential at court and, to a lesser extent, throughout parts of western Europe, very little of his music was published during his lifetime, and not much more has been published since his death.

The majority of Brunetti's output (451 pieces) consists of chamber music designed for small ensembles and symphonies for the royal chamber orchestra.  His music, with its graceful melodies and periodic phrasing, respects early classical forms and conventions but also incorporates some more progressive and eclectic elements.

The dearth of modern editions of Brunetti's compositions has helped limit the number of recordings of his work to a mere handful of releases, including a collection of three symphonies performed by Concerto Köln on the Capriccio record label and a group of string quartets performed by the Schuppanzigh Quartet for CPO.

Further reading

Sources
 Belgray, Alice B. and Newell Jenkins. "Brunetti [Bruneti], Gaetano [Caetano, Cayetano]", Grove Music Online
 LABRADOR, Germán. Gaetano Brunetti (1744-1798), Catálogo crítico, temático y cronológico, Madrid, AEDOM, 2005.

External links
 

1744 births
1798 deaths
Italian Classical-period composers
18th-century Italian composers
18th-century Italian male musicians
Italian male classical composers
String quartet composers